William H. Nicholas (October 10, 1892 – August 13, 1984) was an American politician who served twice as the Lieutenant Governor of Iowa.

Early life and education 
Born in Butler County, Iowa to William A. Nicholas and Elizabeth H. Nicholas, Nicholas raised turkeys in Cerro Gordo County, Iowa and served in the United States Navy during World War I.

Career 
Nicholas served as a member of the Iowa House of Representatives from 1946 to 1948. Later, he served as the 34th Lieutenant Governor of Iowa from 1951 to 1953 serving under Governor William S. Beardsley and from 1957 to 1959, serving under Governor Herschel C. Loveless. He died in Mason City, Iowa. Nicholas was a Freemason. From 1959 to 1963, Nicholas served on the Iowa Highway Commission.

Personal life
Nicholas married Viola Folkers of Allison, Iowa in 1922. He had three children.

Notes

External links
 William H. Nicholas, Iowa General Assembly file

1892 births
1984 deaths
People from Butler County, Iowa
People from Cerro Gordo County, Iowa
Republican Party members of the Iowa House of Representatives
Lieutenant Governors of Iowa
20th-century American politicians